Thomas Freeman, (ca. 1590–1630), was a minor English Jacobean poet and epigramist who is mostly remembered for writing an early poem addressed to Shakespeare. Freeman was born near Moreton-in-Marsh, Gloucestershire, and entered Magdalen College, Oxford, in 1607 at the age of 16 and matriculated with a Bachelor of Arts 22 June 1611.

After graduation he moved to London, and in 1614 published two collections of epigrams in one volume, Rvbbe, and A great Caste, and Rvnne And a great Cast: the second bowle, dedicated to Thomas, Lord Windsor. They were addressed to many of the contemporary poets as well as the poets of history, including Chaucer, Shakespeare, Daniel, Donne, Spenser, Heywood, and Chapman. His last poem was written in 1630 to commemorate the birth of Charles, Prince of Wales.

His Epigram 92 is an early example of Shakespeare criticism.

His epigram 37 has attracted some attention from modern readers, owing perhaps to its self-reflexive commentary:

References 

 Bloxam, John Rouse. Magdalen College Register, The Demies, Vol. II. John Parker: Oxford, London, 1876, pp. 33–34.

1590s births
1630 deaths
Alumni of Magdalen College, Oxford
English male poets